Polygala sanguinea, known as purple milkwort, field milkwort, or blood milkwort is an annual plant in the Polygalaceae (milkwort) family. It is native to central and eastern North America.

Description
The flowers are pink, green, or occasionally white. After blooming, the flowers are replaced by 2 hairy seeds within a capsule. The leaves are widely spaced along the stem, alternate, and linear or narrowly elliptical. When crushed, the root of the plant smells of wintergreen.

Distribution and habitat
The plant is native to widespread areas of eastern North America. It is native in the United States from New Mexico to the west, the Canadian border to the north, Texas to the south, and the coast to the east (except in Florida). In Canada, it is native in Ontario, Quebec, New Brunswick, Nova Scotia, and Prince Edward Island.

P. sanguinea is it generally found in wet, acidic soils in open areas such as prairies and fields.

Ecology
Flowers bloom from May to October. Small to medium-sized bees and bee flies are attracted to the pollen and nectar.

References

sanguinea
Plants described in 1753
Taxa named by Carl Linnaeus